This is a list of administrators and governors of Oyo State, Nigeria. Oyo State was formed in 1976  when Western State was divided into Ogun, Ondo, and Oyo states.

See also
Nigeria
States of Nigeria
List of state governors of Nigeria

References

 

Oyo
Governors